Sometimes I Wish I Was on a Desert Island is a Canadian short documentary film, directed by Eli Jean Tahchi and released in 2020. Part of The Curve, a National Film Board of Canada series of short films on people's experiences during the COVID-19 pandemic in Canada, the film highlights the unique experiences of gay-identified Muslim men, a group who were already experiencing marginalization and ostracism even before COVID-related lockdowns, using a blend of animation and blurred or cropped footage to protect the identities of the speakers.

The film was a Prix Iris nominee for Best Short Documentary at the 24th Quebec Cinema Awards.

References

External links

2020 films
2020 short documentary films
2020 LGBT-related films
Canadian short documentary films
Canadian LGBT-related short films
National Film Board of Canada documentaries
National Film Board of Canada short films
Documentary films about LGBT and Islam
Films about the COVID-19 pandemic
English-language Canadian films
French-language Canadian films
Arabic-language Canadian films
2020s Canadian films